Ronald Frederick Ralston (7 January 1903 – 30 October 1962) was an Australian politician who represented the South Australian House of Assembly seat of Mount Gambier from 1958 to 1962 for the Labor Party.

References

1903 births
1962 deaths
Members of the South Australian House of Assembly
Australian Labor Party members of the Parliament of South Australia
20th-century Australian politicians